Caleta del Sol was a 2014 Chilean telenovela produced and broadcast by, TVN.

Carolina Arregui, Gonzalo Vivanco and Francisco Melo are the leading roles, with Gabriela Medina, Nicolás Oyarzún, Daniela Lhorente and Karla Melo as the antagonist.

Cast 
Carolina Arregui as Elena Aránguiz.
Gonzalo Vivanco as Ignacio Cox.
Francisco Melo as Crescente Maturana Gutierrez.
Daniela Lhorente as Mariana Sandoval.
Luis Alarcón as  Nicasio "Don Lobo" Mardones.
Mayte Rodríguez as Bárbara Hidalgo Aránguiz.
Renata Bravo as Clara Montecinos.
Jorge Arecheta as Gerardo "Lobo Chico" Luna Paredes.
Valentina Carvajal as Catalina "Chica K" Infante.
Matías Assler as Vicente "Vicho" Foster.
Patricio Strahovsky as Francisco Hidalgo.
Ignacio Susperreguy as Nicolás Hidalgo Aránguiz.
Nicolás Oyarzún as Gabriel Opazo.
Karla Melo as Fabiana Cordero.
Tatiana Molina as Lidia San Juan.
Grimanesa Jiménez as Miriam Paredes.
Andrés Velasco as Federico Galván.
Gabriel Cañas as Darío "Chungungo" Jérez San Juan.
Erto Pantoja as Emilio Viveros.
Gabriela Medina as Juana Gutiérrez.
Silvana Salgueiro as Estrella Jérez San Juan.
Macarena Teke as Sandra Soto Montecinos.
Mario Bustos as Mario Luna.
Roberto Prieto as Padre Juan Eduardo "Lalo" Pascal.
Camila Laso as Vanesa.
Marcelo Gutiérrez as Felipe.
Elisa Alemparte as Maribel.
Nicolás Platovsky as Sebastián.
Daniel de la Vega as Agustin

References 

2014 telenovelas
2014 Chilean television series debuts
2015 Chilean television series endings
Chilean telenovelas
Spanish-language telenovelas
Televisión Nacional de Chile telenovelas